Karol Borys (born 28 September 2006) is a Polish professional footballer who plays as a midfielder for Śląsk Wrocław.

Club career 
Karol Borys first played in Otmuchów before joining the Śląsk Wrocław Academy in 2013. He signed his first professional contract there in October 2021, having previously attended a trial at Manchester United.

On 21 May 2022, Borys made his professional debut for Śląsk's first team, coming on as a substitute in the last 20 minutes of a 3–4 home loss to Górnik Zabrze during the last matchday of the 2021–22 season. By doing so, he became the first player born in 2006 to appear in Ekstraklasa and displaced Mirosław Pękala as the youngest player in the history of the Silesian club.

References

External links

Football Talent Scout profile

2006 births
Living people
Polish footballers
Poland youth international footballers
Association football midfielders
People from Nysa County
Śląsk Wrocław players
Ekstraklasa players
II liga players